National Route 177 is a national highway in Japan connecting Kyoto Maizuru Port (Maizuru, Kyoto) and Maizuru, Kyoto. Its total length is 0.7 km (0.43 mi). It is one of the shortest national highways in Japan.

References

177
Roads in Kyoto Prefecture